Casey McGahee (born December 7, 1983) is a former Canadian football wide receiver. He was signed by the Winnipeg Blue Bombers as an undrafted free agent in 2008. He played college football at Florida Atlantic.

McGahee was also a member of the Saskatchewan Roughriders.

External links
Saskatchewan Roughriders bio

1983 births
Living people
People from Fort Myers, Florida
American players of Canadian football
Canadian football wide receivers
Florida Atlantic Owls football players
Winnipeg Blue Bombers players
Saskatchewan Roughriders players